The 1955–58 Magyar Kupa (English: Hungarian Cup) was the 24th season of Hungary's annual knock-out cup football competition. The 1955 Magyar Kupa season was interrupted by the 1956 Hungarian uprising. Therefore, the final was held in 1958.

Final

See also
 1955 Nemzeti Bajnokság I

References

External links
 Official site 
 soccerway.com

1955–56 in Hungarian football
1955–56 domestic association football cups
1955-58